Typhoon Page, known in the Philippines as Typhoon Tering, was the fourth tropical cyclone to strike Japan in three months and the sixth in 1990. An area of disturbed weather developed on November 5 near the International Date Line. For more than two weeks, the disturbance failed to develop appreciably while it tracked generally westward. The disturbance began to organize on November 17. Four days later, the disturbance was designated a tropical depression, and on November 22, the depression was classified as a tropical storm. After resuming a westward course, Page intensified into a typhoon on November 24. Page then entered a period of rapid deepening before plateauing in intensity early on November 26. Page turned northwest, north, and later northeast as it rounded a subtropical ridge. Because of the change in steering, Page began to encounter stronger wind shear, which resulted in a prolonged weakening trend. On November 30, Page, just offshore Honshu, weakened below typhoon intensity, and became an extratropical cyclone on the same day after making landfall in central Honshu.

Typhoon Page was the record sixth tropical cyclone to directly affect Japan that year. It also was the latest typhoon to hit the country, with the previous mark set by Typhoon Agnes of the 1948 Pacific typhoon season. In Tokyo, 61 homes were damaged and 16 were destroyed. Elsewhere, in Mie Prefecture, 276 homes were damaged and 9 other homes were destroyed.  Overall, four fatalities were reported and twelve others suffered injuries. A total of 162 homes were destroyed while 1,544 other houses were flooded. Nearly 35 ha (85 acres) of farmland were damaged. Total damage was estimated at 4.8 billion yen ($33 million USD).

Meteorological history

The origins of Typhoon Page can be traced back to an area of disturbed weather that was first tracked by the Joint Typhoon Warning Center (JTWC) at 06:00 UTC on November 5. After forming near the International Date Line, the disturbance tracked northwest initially before turning west three days later. The disturbance failed to develop appreciably due to strong easterly wind shear aloft. Poorly organized, the disturbance then briefly turned west-northwest under the influence of a subtropical ridge. Convection organization improved, and on November 17, Dvorak classifications reached T1.5/, which prompted the JTWC to issue a Tropical Cyclone Formation Alert. The low-level center became better defined overnight in response to decreased wind shear, and on November 19, the JTWC upgraded the disturbance into a tropical depression.

The depression executed a counterclockwise loop for the next two days. Meanwhile, organized deep convection quickly developed over the center, and on November 21, the disturbance was upgraded into a tropical depression by the Japan Meteorological Agency (JMA). At 00:00 UTC on November 22, the JTWC upgraded the depression into Tropical Storm Page. Several hours later, the JMA followed suit. Resuming a westward track, Page began to intensify at a faster pace on November 23 due to decreased wind shear. The JMA upgraded Page to a severe tropical storm at 18:00 UTC on November 23. Following the development of a small eye, Page was upgraded into a typhoon twelve hours later by the JTWC, with the JMA following suit on the evening of November 24. Based on the appearance of a  well-defined eye, Page was declared a super typhoon by the JTWC, the second of the month, at 06:00 UTC on November 26.

Typhoon Page, while maintaining peak strength, began to turn northwest on the evening of November 26 as it approached a break in the subtropical ridge. The next day, the typhoon turned northward along the 125th meridian east, then accelerated to the northeast as it rounded a ridge. As a result of the change in steering, Page began to encounter stronger wind shear. A loss in eye definition and a decrease in Dvorak estimates led to the JTWC downgrading Page back to a typhoon at 18:00 UTC on November 27. The storm continued to gradually deteriorate, and on November 30, the JMA downgraded Page to a severe tropical storm. However, the JTWC did not downgrade Page into a tropical storm until 12:00 UTC as wind shear continued to take toll on the system. Later that day, the JTWC issued its last warning based on a combination of land interaction with Honshu and extratropical transition. The JMA stopped tracking the extratropical remnants of Page on December 3.

Impact
The typhoon dropped heavy rainfall across much of the Japanese archipelago. Meanwhile, a peak daily precipitation total of  fell in Hidegadake.

Damage to Okinawa Prefecture amounted to 87.8 million yen. Ten flights and ferry service to and from Okinawa Prefecture were cancelled. Nearby, schools and public offices were closed on Minamidaitōjima. Twenty-seven flights to and from Tokushima Prefecture were cancelled. In Kagoshima Prefecture, on the southern tip of the island of Kyushu, damage amounted to 149 million yen. Approximately 600 homes in Wakayama Prefecture lost power. Across Osaka Prefecture.  of crops were damaged, amounting to 232 million yen. Four landslides damaged five roads in Kobe. Five flights to and from Oki Airport were called off. Around 18,000 homes briefly lost power in Sagamihara. In Tokyo, 61 homes were damaged and 16 were destroyed. Offshore, the vessel Panama Flag sunk, which led to the disappearance of one person.

Further north, in Mie Prefecture, where the storm made landfall, 276 homes were damaged and 9 others were demolished, which resulted in 30 people losing their homes. Damage in the prefecture was estimated at 3.38 billion yen. Strong winds downed many trees and power lines, leaving 9,600 households without electricity. One person was wounded in Chiba Prefecture. Eleven homes were damaged and four were destroyed. A total of 176 train lines were also cancelled. A 55-year-old man drowned in Saitama Prefecture. There, a total of 584 homes were damaged and 74 other houses were destroyed. Damage in Saitama Prefecture was estimated at 1.66 billion yen. Crop damage in Gunma prefecture was estimated at 128 million yen. Strong winds damaged 24 homes in Nagano Prefecture. Around 2,500 homes lost power in Niigata Prefecture. One person was injured in Fukushima Prefecture. A total of 126 homes were damaged and 17 homes were destroyed in Soma, which resulted in authorities evacuating 834 individuals. Throughout Miyagi Prefecture, 282 homes were damaged and 19 were demolished. Damage there amounted to 2.66 billion yen. Offshore
Yamagata Prefecture, a 62-year-old man drowned. Ninety homes were damaged in Akita Prefecture. On the northern tip of Honshu, in Aomori Prefecture two people were injured and 82 homes suffered damage.

Typhoon Page was the sixth tropical cyclone to directly affect Japan in 1990, setting a record for the most systems to hit the country in a year; it was also the latest typhoon to hit the country, with the previous mark set by Typhoon Agnes of the 1948 Pacific typhoon season. Nationwide, four fatalities were reported and twelve others sustained injuries. Almost 170 domestic flights were cancelled. A total 162 houses were destroyed while 1,544 others were flooded. Monetary damage totaled 4.8 billion yen.

See also

Typhoon Hal (1985)

Notes

References

External links

P
P
P
P